Kaamchor is a 1982 Bollywood drama movie. Produced by Rakesh Roshan, the film was directed by K. Viswanath, the Hindi version of his Telugu film Subhodhayam (1980). The film stars Rakesh Roshan, Jaya Prada, Tanuja, Sujit Kumar, Suresh Oberoi, Shreeram Lagoo and Bhagwan Dada. The film's music is by the producer and lead actor's brother - Rajesh Roshan. The film became a superhit, along with the songs. Rakesh Roshan's nephew in the film is played by a young Sonu Nigam, who later became a playback singer.

Premise 
Suraj has been an aimless and lazy slacker all his adult life, who has no goals for his future. He lives in Delhi with his brother, sister in law, and nephew. On one occasion, he gate-crashes into one of his brother's supervisor's friend's wedding ceremony and finds out that the would be groom is to live with his In-laws. To Suraj's delight, he finds out that the bride has an unmarried sister. And so he pursues her to get married to him.

Cast
Rakesh Roshan as Suraj
Jaya Prada as Geeta Sanghvi
Suresh Oberoi as Suresh
Neeta Mehta as Roopa Sanghvi, wife of Suresh
Sujit Kumar as Sohan
Tanuja as Radha, Sohan's wife
Shriram Lagoo as Rai Bahadur Chunilal Sanghvi
Pinchoo Kapoor as Sohan's employer who attends the marriage of Roopa
Asrani as Astrologer
Bhagwan Dada as Accordion player (special appearance in song "Jogi O Jogi")
Sonu Nigam as Sonu - Sohan's & Radha's son (child artist) (as Master Sonu)
Meena T as Who gives Job to Suraj in Glass factory

Music
Rajesh Roshan gave the music for this film. Songs were penned by Indeevar.

References

External links

1980s Hindi-language films
Films directed by K. Viswanath
Hindi remakes of Telugu films
Indian romantic drama films
Films scored by Rajesh Roshan
Fiction about social issues
Fiction about society
Works about economics
Alternative education
Indian films with live action and animation
1982 romantic drama films